was a Japanese football player and manager. He played for Japan national team.

Club career
Nishimura was born in Hyogo Prefecture in 1912. He played for Kwangaku Club was consisted of his alma mater Kwansei Gakuin University players and graduates. He won 1930 Emperor's Cup with Yukio Goto and Hideo Sakai and so on at the club.

National team career
In May 1934, when Nishimura was a Kwansei Gakuin University student, he was selected Japan national team for 1934 Far Eastern Championship Games in Manila. At this competition, on May 13, he debuted against Dutch East Indies. On May 15, he also played and scored a goal against Philippines. He played 2 games and scored 1 goal for Japan in 1934. In 1936, he was also selected Japan for 1936 Summer Olympics in Berlin, but he did not compete. At this competition, Japan completed a come-from-behind victory first game against Sweden. The first victory in Olympics for the Japan and the historic victory over one of the powerhouses became later known as "Miracle of Berlin" (ベルリンの奇跡) in Japan. In 2016, this team was selected Japan Football Hall of Fame.

Coaching career
After retirement, Nishimura became a manager for his alma mater Kwansei Gakuin University and Kwangaku Club. As Kwangaku Club manager, he led the club to won 1958 and 1959 Emperor's Cup. In 1976, he signed with Japan Soccer League Division 2 club Yomiuri. In 1977 season, he led the club to won the championship and promoted Division 1. He resigned in 1980.

On March 22, 1998, Nishimura died of pneumonia in Akashi at the age of 86.

National team statistics

References

External links
 
 Japan National Football Team Database
Japan Football Hall of Fame (Japan team at 1936 Olympics) at Japan Football Association

1912 births
1998 deaths
Kwansei Gakuin University alumni
Waseda University alumni
Association football people from Hyōgo Prefecture
Japanese footballers
Japan international footballers
Olympic footballers of Japan
Footballers at the 1936 Summer Olympics
Japanese football managers
Association football forwards
Deaths from pneumonia in Japan